Lyubov. Yad  is the ninth studio album and the first Russian-language album by Ukrainian singer Irina Bilyk released on 7 July 2004 by Mamamusic and Astra Records.

Overview
This was the first Russian-language album in Bilyk's career, before that she released only Ukrainian-language material, and in 2003 she released an album Biłyk in Polish.

A team of authors led by Bilyk worked on the album. She was involved in writing or producing almost every song on the album. Artur Zheleznyak, Sergey Dotsenko, Vitaly Kurovsky and Ruslan Kvinta also participated in writing music and lyrics. The album included a song "Ty - na sever, ya - na yug" that was recorded as a duet with Verka Serduchka and which was previously released on her album Chita Drita (2003).

Several music videos were released before the album's release: "Sneg" (directed by Alan Badoev), "Pomnit" and "Lyubov. Yad" (both directed by Alexander and Igor Stekolenko). They appeared as bonus on the CD release of the album.

Lyubov. Yad was released on 7 July 2004. The number of pre-orders exceeded 53,000 copies, and sales in the first two weeks exceeded 100,000. The album was able to receive platinum certification in Ukraine. The album was also released in Russia. According to Irina Bilyk, representatives of the largest Russian radio station Russkoye Radio (and its holding Russian Mediagroup) refused to promote the album in the country.

For the first time since 1995, Bilyk did not go on an all-Ukrainian concert tour in support of the new album.

Russian singer Filipp Kirkorov covered and popularized the cong "Sneg" in 2011. It reached top-40 in Russian music chart and received Golden Gramophone. Kirkorov also performed this song in duo with Bilyk on different shows.

In 2012, this album was nominated for the Ukrainian music award YUNA for Best album of twenty years and the song "Sneg" for Best song of twenty years. In 2020, the song "Sneg" was included in the list "20 iconic songs for 20 years" by YUNA.

Track listing

Personnel
Musicians
 Irina Bilyk – lead vocals (all tracks), songwriting (2, 4, 5, 9, 11-13), production (all tracks)
 Andrey Danilko – lead vocals (12)
 Artur Zheleznyak – songwriting (1-3, 7, 8, 10)
 Sergey Dotsenko – songwriting (4, 11), background vocals (2, 4, 7, 11), keyboards (4, 7, 11, 13), guitar (4, 7, 11, 13)
 Vitaly Kurovsky – songwriting (6)
 Ruslan Kvinta – songwriting (6), keyboards (6)
 Yury Nikitin – production (all tracks)
 Gennady Krupnik – background vocals (12), keyboards (1, 3, 5, 12)
 Tatyana Lukanova – background vocals (4, 7–9, 11)
 Students of Lyceum No. 195 – background vocals
 Sergey Mishchenko – keyboards (5)
 Gennady Dyakonov – keyboards (2, 8, 10), guitar (2, 8, 10)
 Yegor Olesov – keyboards (9)
 Sergey Dobrovolsky – guitar (1, 3, 11, 12)
 Oleg Makarevich – guitar (6)
 Ivan Lokhmanyuk – bass guitar (9)
 Oleg Fedosov – drums (9)
 Roman Soluk – brass (13)
 Dmitry Glushchenko – cello (5)
 Sergey Kazakov – cello (13)
 Maria Kapshuchenko – violin (9)
 Yulia Rabishchuk – violin (9) 
 Senyon Lebedev – viola (9)

Technical
 Gennady Krupnik – arrangement (1, 3, 5, 12), programming (1, 3, 5, 12)
 Ruslan Kvinta – arrangement (6), programming (6)
 Gennady Dyakonov – arrangement (2, 8, 10), programming (2, 8, 10)
 Sergey Dotsenko – arrangement (4, 7, 11, 13), programming (4, 7, 11, 13)
 Yegor Olesov – arrangement (9), programming (9)
 Sergey Dobrovolsky – recording (1-8, 9-13), mixing (1-8, 9-13) 
 Oleg Stepanenkov – recording (6), mixing (6) 
 Igor Prigorovsky – recording (9), mixing (9)

Studios
 Mamamusic Studio (2003-2004, Kyiv, Ukraine) – recording (1-8, 9-13), mixing (1-8, 9-13), mastering (all tracks) 
 Radio Apelsin Studio (2004, Kyiv, Ukraine) – recording (6), mixing (6)
 Angel Studio (2004, Kyiv, Ukraine) – recording (9), mixing (9)

Management and marketing
 Yury Nikitin / Nova Management – management, executive production
 Tatyana Krupnik – project management
 Taras Malyarevich – photography

Charts

Sales and certifications

References

2004 albums
Iryna Bilyk albums
Mamamusic albums
Russian-language albums